United Nations General Assembly Resolution ES‑11/4 is the fourth resolution of the eleventh emergency special session of the United Nations General Assembly, adopted on 12 October 2022, following Resolution ES-11/3 which was adopted on 7 April 2022. Resolution ES‑11/4 declares that Russia's so-called referendums in the Donetsk, Kherson, Luhansk and Zaporizhzhia oblasts and the subsequent attempted annexation are invalid and illegal under international law. It calls upon all states to not recognize these territories as part of Russia. Furthermore, it demands that Russia "immediately, completely and unconditionally withdraw" from Ukraine as it is violating its territorial integrity and sovereignty. The resolution was passed with an overwhelming vote of 143 in favour, 5 against and 35 abstaining. This resolution achieved more votes in favour of condemning Russia's actions than Resolution ES-11/1, the initial resolution on the Russian invasion of Ukraine which demanded that Russia withdraw its forces from Ukraine.

Background 

From 23 to 27 September 2022 Russia staged annexation referendums in the Donetsk, Kherson, Luhansk and Zaporizhzhia regions of Ukraine. The referendums are widely considered to be sham referendums.

Following these referendums, on 30 September 2022, Russian President Putin declared and decreed that these four regions would be annexed into Russia. At the time of the announcement, Russia only partly controlled some of the regions that were to be annexed.

On 30 September 2022, Russia vetoed the United Nations Security Council resolution to declare the sham referendums and annexation illegal. Under newly adopted procedures, the use of a veto in the Security Council triggers a meeting of the United Nations General Assembly. During the meeting of the General Assembly, the underlying draft resolution for ES-11/4, which is ES-11/L.5, was presented and adopted.

Secret ballot proposal 
Prior to the vote on the resolution, Russia called for the measure to be voted on by secret ballot, arguing that countries would have difficulties representing certain positions in public. Russia's proposal was rejected by the General Assembly with 107 votes in favour of a public vote, 13 against and 39 abstaining. A secret ballot vote on a resolution would have been highly unusual as United Nations votes are generally held in public.

Vote 
On 12 October 2022, the United Nations General Assembly, which required a two-thirds majority, adopted the resolution with 143 countries voting in favour, 5 voting against and 35 abstaining.

The resolution achieved the most votes in favour out of all resolutions adopted during the 11th Emergency Special Session of the General Assembly, which is focused on the Russian invasion of Ukraine. The resolution also achieved far more votes in favour than 2014 Resolution 68/262 rejecting the annexation of Crimea. As such, the overwhelming voting result on Resolution ES 11/4 went beyond the most optimistic expectations by Western sponsors.

See also 
 Eleventh emergency special session of the United Nations General Assembly
 Legality of the 2022 Russian invasion of Ukraine
 United Nations General Assembly Resolution 68/262
 United Nations General Assembly Resolution ES-11/1
 United Nations General Assembly Resolution ES-11/2
 United Nations General Assembly Resolution ES-11/3
 United Nations General Assembly Resolution ES-11/5
 United Nations General Assembly resolution
 United Nations Security Council Resolution 2623

References

External links 

 Text of resolution ES-11/4 at UN Digital Library

United Nations General Assembly resolutions
2022 Russian invasion of Ukraine
Reactions to the 2022 Russian invasion of Ukraine
Russo-Ukrainian War
2022 documents
2022 in the United Nations
Ukraine and the United Nations
Russia and the United Nations
October 2022 events